The AGESSA is a French association that manages social security taxation for some individuals who earn money through licensing or sale of original, copyrighted material such as photographs, musical manuscripts, or written texts. The AGESSA exists since January 1, 1978, and stands for Association pour la Gestion de la Sécurité Sociale des Auteurs (Association for the Management of Authors' Social Security).

Precise information regarding taxation can be obtained from their website, as the percentages and manners of payment change regularly. In recent years, a percentage of proceeds from copyright licensing in France must be paid directly to the AGESSA by the party obtaining the license. For example, imagine that a script is licensed to a production company for the filming of a movie. If the contract of sale of the license to use the script stipulates that the production company will pay the author 10,000 euro, the production company will not, in fact, pay the author 10,000 euro. Rather, the production company will pay the author some lesser amount (in 2006, 9215.5 euro) and will pay the AGESSA the remainder (in 2007, 784.5). This may be thought of as the equivalent of the Federal Tax Withholding in the United States. The monies withheld by the buyer do not account for all tax to be paid.

External links
 Official website

Taxation in France
Non-profit organizations based in France
Social security in France
Organizations based in Paris